Wallace Oliveira dos Santos,  or simply Wallace (born 1 May 1994), is a Brazilian professional footballer who plays as a right back for Sampaio Corrêa-RJ.

Club career

Fluminense
Wallace started his career with Brazilian club Fluminense, an attacking right-back, Wallace made his senior debut at the age of 17. He has since gone on to appear many times for the first team, helping them to the Brazilian league championship, the Rio State League and the Guanabara Cup.

Chelsea
On 4 December 2012, Chelsea confirmed they had signed Wallace. As part of the deal, the 19-year-old central defender who can also play right, left and midfield would remain with Fluminense until the end of the season. He made his first appearance in a Chelsea jersey on 17 July 2013 in a pre-season friendly match versus Singha All Stars in which he earned a penalty for his side which Romelu Lukaku converted.

Loan to Internazionale
Due to a lack of work permit, Wallace was required to be loaned out. On 14 August 2013, Wallace was loaned to Internazionale on a season long deal. He made his debut for the club on 1 September 2013 in a 0–3 away win at Catania, coming on as an 83rd-minute substitute for Jonathan. Wallace made his second appearance for Inter in a 0–7 thumping at Sassuolo on 22 September 2013, again coming on as a second-half substitute. He played just four matches for Inter, three of them as a substitute.

Loan to Vitesse
On 30 June 2014, Wallace was loaned for the upcoming season to the Dutch Eredivisie club Vitesse Arnhem, with whom Chelsea have a partnership.

On 10 August 2014, Wallace made his debut for Vitesse against Ajax, playing the full 90 minutes; the game ended in a 4–1 loss for Vitesse. On 27 September 2014, Wallace scored his first goal for Vitesse against FC Dordrecht, assisted by fellow Chelsea loanee, Bertrand Traoré; the ended in a 6–2 win for Vitesse. Wallace continued to be the first-choice right back for Vitesse until he broke his hand on 25 October 2014, during the game against NAC Breda. On 22 November 2014, Wallace returned to the starting line-up against AZ Alkmaar; the match ended in a 1–0 loss for Vitesse.

On 10 April 2015, Wallace was arrested for suspicion of sexual offense, but was released later without any charges. Following this incident, Wallace returned to the first team on 24 April on the bench, and coming on for the last 11 minutes replacing Kevin Diks in the match against ADO Den Haag.

Loan to Carpi
On 22 July 2015, Wallace joined newly promoted Italian side Carpi on a season-long loan with an option to purchase the player at the end of the spell. He made his debut for the club on 23 August 2015, in a 5–2 defeat against Sampdoria, coming off the bench to play 20 minutes.

Loan to Grêmio
On 4 January 2016, Wallace was loaned to Grêmio by Chelsea for an 18-month period to replace Rafael Galhardo in the 2016 Copa Libertadores On 31 January 2016, Wallace made his Grêmio debut in a 3–1 victory over Brasil de Pelotas, playing the full 90 minutes.

International career
Wallace helped Brazil win the South American Under-17 Championship in 2011 before contributing to their fourth-placed finish at the Under-17 World Cup in Mexico three months later. On 30 May 2014 Wallace scored the first of seven goals for Brazil U20 vs Qatar U20 in the Toulon tournament.

Career statistics

Honours
Fluminense
Campeonato Brasileiro Série A: 2012
Campeonato Carioca: 2012
Taça Guanabara: 2012

Grêmio
Copa do Brasil: 2016

References

1994 births
Living people
Association football fullbacks
Brazilian footballers
Brazil youth international footballers
Fluminense FC players
Chelsea F.C. players
Inter Milan players
SBV Vitesse players
A.C. Carpi players
Grêmio Foot-Ball Porto Alegrense players
Campeonato Brasileiro Série A players
Serie A players
Eredivisie players
Brazilian expatriate footballers
Expatriate footballers in England
Expatriate footballers in Italy
Expatriate footballers in the Netherlands
Brazilian expatriate sportspeople in England
Brazilian expatriate sportspeople in Italy
Brazilian expatriate sportspeople in the Netherlands
Footballers from Rio de Janeiro (city)